Barbaceniopsis is a plant genus in the family Velloziaceae, described as a genus in 1962. It is native to South America (Peru, Bolivia, northern Argentina)

 Species
 Barbaceniopsis boliviensis (Baker) L.B.Sm. - Bolivia, northern Argentina
 Barbaceniopsis castillonii (Hauman) Ibisch - Bolivia
 Barbaceniopsis humahuaquensis Noher. - Jujuy Province in northwestern Argentina
 Barbaceniopsis vargasiana (L.B.Sm.) L.B.Sm. - Peru

References 

Velloziaceae
Pandanales genera